James Ernest Lamy (May 30, 1928 – May 30, 1992) was an American bobsledder who competed in the mid-1950s. He won a bronze medal in the four-man event at the 1956 Winter Olympics in Cortina d'Ampezzo.

References
Bobsleigh four-man Olympic medalists for 1924, 1932-56, and since 1964
DatabaseOlympics.com profile
James Lamy's profile at Sports Reference.com

1928 births
1992 deaths
American male bobsledders
Bobsledders at the 1956 Winter Olympics
Bobsledders at the 1964 Winter Olympics
Olympic bronze medalists for the United States in bobsleigh
Medalists at the 1956 Winter Olympics